Ishëm Castle (Albanian:Kalaja e Ishmit) is a castle in Ishëm, Durrës County, Albania. It is located on a hill above the river Ishëm. It was built from 1572 to 1574 by Ottomans  to stop the peasant rebellions. The Albanian painter Ibrahim Kodra was buried in front of it.

References

Castles in Albania
Buildings and structures in Durrës

Tourist attractions in Durrës County